Duct Tape Forever is a 2002 comedy film based on The Red Green Show. It was written by Steve Smith, the actor who plays Red Green.

Plot
When property developer Robert Stiles' limousine gets stuck in a sink hole on Possum Lodge's property and several attempts to recover it send it into the lake, Stiles takes the matter to court.  The town council and the presiding judge, who have been looking for decades for a way to shut down the Lodge, fine the lodge $10,000 and give them thirty days to pay, after which, if they are not successful, the Lodge ownership will revert to the town.  Red's nephew Harold Green (Patrick McKenna) pleads with the judge for a change to the time limit and she agrees - she makes it ten days instead.

The Lodge members try to brainstorm a way out of the mess, but once again Harold is the only one with a viable idea - 3M is running a duct tape sculpture contest in Minnesota, with a third prize of $10,000 (which the members feel they have a shot at).  The members beg, borrow and steal enough duct tape to construct a goose, and Red, Harold and Dalton Humphrey (Bob Bainborough) set off for the long ride to the contest.

However, sinister forces are at work. Stiles has convinced the town's sheriff (Darren Frost) to stop the trio by any means necessary.  The sheriff is accompanied by Dawn (Melissa DiMarco), his beautiful deputy,  who against all logic is smitten with Harold, although Harold is currently smitten with Dalton's indifferent daughter.

The sheriff attempts a number of dirty tricks in order to waylay Red.  At one point he and Dawn flatten the Possum Van's tires, only to find out that Dalton has siphoned all the gas out of their police car, and that the nearest working gas pump is 20 miles away.  At another point, the sheriff digs a hole in the road with a backhoe, but finds the police car on the opposite side from the van.  In attempting to use the backhoe to move the police car to the other side of the hole, the sheriff instead drops the car into the hole, and the Possum Van drives right over it.

Eventually, Stiles takes matters into his own hands and kidnaps Harold.  Red sends Dalton back to the lodge for reinforcements, as he plans to get away with both Harold and the goose.  While Harold is suffering the company of Stiles, Stiles reveals that his father was a lazy Possum Lodge member, and that his mother's frustration over this fact drove him to succeed at any cost. He plans on buying Possum Lodge to convert it into a women's club called "Possum Landing."

At noon the next day, Red and Stiles meet with Red backed by his lodge members, and Stiles backed by his gang of workers.  Just as the exchange is made, Red makes a getaway with Harold and the goose as the lodge members steal the cars of the workers.

Just as Red feels he has made his getaway, he finds that Stiles is chasing him with the only vehicle left from the site of the exchange – the bus that brought the lodge members to the showdown.  Nevertheless, Red and Harold manage to make it to the contest just before they award third prize, winning it when the goose (pulled behind the Possum Van on a small trailer) detaches and flies over the contest to land majestically with all of the other entries.

After the contest the members of the lodge gather in the meeting room to celebrate with a large cake. Harold has invited Stiles to the meeting, who takes it as an attempt to humiliate him, before realizing Harold has invited his elderly mother as well and the two reconcile. While the candles on the cake are lit, Dawn entices Harold outside where they share a passionate kiss before the candles (which are revealed to be dynamite) explode. The film ends with a dazed Harold rejoining the group as Red asks for the duct tape to repair the damage.

Cast
  Steve Smith  ...  Red Green  
  Patrick McKenna  ...  Harold Green  
  Bob Bainborough  ...  Dalton Humphrey  
  Wayne Robson  ...  Mike Hamar  
  Jeff Lumby  ...  Winston Rothschild III  
  Jerry Schaefer  ...  Ed Frid  
  Richard Fitzpatrick  ...  Robert Stiles
  Graham Greene  ...  Edgar K.B. Montrose
  Dave Broadfoot ... Mountie
 Peter Keleghan ... Ranger Gord
  Lawrence Dane ... Prosecutor

References

External links

2002 films
Canadian comedy films
Films set in Northern Ontario
Films directed by Eric Till
2000s English-language films
2000s Canadian films